Daniel Milton Newhouse (born July 10, 1955) is an American politician and agricultural scientist serving as the U.S. representative for . The district covers much of the central third of the state, including Yakima and the Tri-Cities. Before his election to Congress, Newhouse served as director of the Washington State Department of Agriculture and as a member of the Washington House of Representatives. He is a member of the Republican Party.

Newhouse was one of ten House Republicans who voted to impeach Donald Trump during Trump's second impeachment, and one of two Republicans to vote for impeachment and win reelection in 2022, along with David Valadao of California.

Early life and career
Newhouse was born in Sunnyside, east of Yakima. His father's family was Dutch. His parents and all his siblings graduated from Washington State University. Newhouse's father Irv served in the Washington State House and Senate for 34 years, retiring in 1998.

Newhouse graduated from Washington State with a Bachelor of Science degree in agricultural economics in 1977. In college, he was a member of Alpha Gamma Rho fraternity. He also is a graduate of the Washington Agriculture and Forestry Leadership Program.

Early career 
Newhouse served four terms in the Washington House of Representatives from 2003 to 2009, representing the 15th district in eastern Yakima County, his father's old district. In 2009, Christine Gregoire, then the governor of Washington, appointed Newhouse to head the Washington State Department of Agriculture. Newly elected governor Jay Inslee did not reappoint Newhouse as agriculture director in 2013.

U.S. House of Representatives

Elections
The incumbent, Doc Hastings, did not run. Newhouse and fellow Republican Clint Didier advanced to the November election after finishing in the top two in the August primary, marking the first time that two Republicans squared off in a general election since the state adopted the "top two" primary system. The 4th has long been Washington's most conservative district, and it was very likely that Hastings would be succeeded by another Republican.

The race was very close, and was seen as a battle between the factions of the GOP; Newhouse is considered a mainstream Republican, while Didier openly identified with the Tea Party movement. Newhouse defeated Didier by a margin of 51%-49%.

Newhouse faced Didier in a rematch in 2016, placing first in the blanket primary with 44,720 votes (45.77%) to Didier's 26,892 (27.53%). In the general election, Newhouse defeated Didier, 132,517 votes (57.64%) to 97,402 (42.36%).

Tenure
In December 2020, Newhouse was one of 126 Republican members of the House of Representatives to sign an amicus brief in support of Texas v. Pennsylvania, a lawsuit filed at the United States Supreme Court contesting the results of the 2020 presidential election, in which Joe Biden defeated incumbent Donald Trump. The Supreme Court declined to hear the case on the basis that Texas lacked standing under Article III of the Constitution to challenge the results of an election held by another state.

Newhouse announced his support for the second impeachment of Donald Trump on January 13, 2021, after the storming of the United States Capitol. In a statement, Newhouse condemned the "hateful and anti-American extremists" who attacked the Capitol, saying that they had been incited by "the language and misinformation of the President of the United States." He claimed that he could not appear to condone the "unacceptable violence" or Trump's "inaction" by voting against impeachment, saying that Trump "failed to fulfill his oath of office" by not responding sooner. He voted to impeach alongside nine other Republicans that day. In his speech supporting impeachment, Newhouse said that while the article charging Trump with incitement of insurrection was "flawed", he also believed there was "no excuse" for Trump's failure to act. He expressed regret for not speaking out sooner against Trump's spreading of election misinformation. Earlier, he told The Spokesman-Review that while he was a Trump supporter, he believed Trump "let us down" by not doing more to stop the violence.

On May 19, 2021, Newhouse became one of 35 Republicans who joined all Democrats in voting to approve legislation to establish the January 6 commission meant to investigate the storming of the U.S. Capitol.

LGBT rights
On July 19, 2022, Newhouse and 46 other Republican Representatives voted for the Respect for Marriage Act, which would codify the right to same-sex marriage in federal law.

Immigration
Newhouse voted for the Further Consolidated Appropriations Act of 2020, which authorized DHS to nearly double the available H-2B visas for the remainder of FY 2020.

Newhouse voted for the Consolidated Appropriations Act (H.R. 1158), which effectively prohibits ICE from cooperating with Health and Human Services to detain or remove illegal alien sponsors of unaccompanied alien children (UACs).

Ukraine
In 2022, Newhouse voted to provide approximately $14 billion to the government of Ukraine.

Caucus memberships
 Congressional Western Caucus 
 Republican Main Street Partnership
 Republican Study Committee
U.S.-Japan Caucus
Republican Governance Group

Personal life

Newhouse owns a  farm in Sunnyside that produces hops, tree fruit, grapes, and alfalfa. His first wife, Carol, died of cancer in 2017. They have two adult children.

In 2018, Newhouse married Joan Galvin in a small ceremony at the Congressional Prayer Room in the United States Capitol building.

Electoral history

2014

2016

2018

2020

2022 

}

References

External links
 Congressman Dan Newhouse official U.S. House website
 Campaign website
 
 
 

|-

1955 births
21st-century American politicians
Farmers from Washington (state)
Living people
Republican Party members of the Washington House of Representatives
People from Sunnyside, Washington
Place of birth missing (living people)
Republican Party members of the United States House of Representatives from Washington (state)
State cabinet secretaries of Washington (state)
Washington State University alumni
American people of Dutch descent